Arcot Ranganatha Mudaliar (29 June 1879 – 8 July 1950) was an Indian politician and theosophist from Bellary. He served as the Minister of Public Health and Excise for the Madras Presidency from 1926 to 1928.

Early life 
Ranganatha Mudaliar was born on 29 June 1879, in an  Arcot Mudaliar family of Madras Presidency. Ranganatha Mudaliar had his schooling in Madras and graduated from Madras Christian College and Madras Law College. Mudaliar joined government service in 1901 and served as Deputy Collector of Bellary. Later, he was influenced by theosophy and became a follower of  Annie Besant.

Public life 

Ranganatha Mudaliar established the Young Men's Indian Association in  1914 and constructed the Gokhale Hall in 1915. Mudaliar accompanied Besant to London in 1924 as a part of the National Convention delegation.

Politics

Ranganatha Mudaliar joined politics  at the instance of the Raja of Panagal of the Justice Party. Ranganatha Mudaliar contested the Madras Legislative Council from Bellary and was elected to the assembly. Mudaliar served as the Minister of Public  Health and Excise in the government of P. Subbarayan from  1926 to 1928, when he resigned protesting the arrival of the Simon Commission. Ranganatha Mudaliar was succeeded by S. Muthiah Mudaliar.

Following his resignation, Ranganatha Mudaliar joined the Indian National Congress and served  as the first Commissioner of the Thirumala-Tirupathi devasthanam board from 1935 to 1939.

Notes

References

 

1879 births
Indian Theosophists
People from Bellary
Madras Christian College alumni
Year of death unknown
1950 deaths
Andhra movement